Harry Mellor (1895 – after 1926) was an English professional footballer who played as a centre forward. He made one league appearance in the Football League Third Division North for Nelson in the 1921–22 campaign.

References

English footballers
Association football forwards
Nelson F.C. players
South Shore F.C. players
English Football League players
Year of death missing
New Mills A.F.C. players
1895 births